Mary Joy Reyes Tabal (born July 13, 1989) is a Filipino marathon runner. She is the first female Filipino marathon runner to qualify for the Olympics, which she has done by running a time of 2:43:29 in the Scotiabank Ottawa Marathon in 2016. She placed 124th at the 2016 Rio Olympics.

Tabal, a veteran of local and international marathons, has won a silver medal in the women's marathon competition in the 2015 Southeast Asian Games in Singapore, and a gold medal in the 2017 SEA Games in Kuala Lumpur Malaysia  and won the women's division title in the National Milo Marathon Finals for six straight years, 2013, 2014, 2015, 2016, 2017 and 2018. She was recognized as the 2016 Athlete of the Year by the Sportswriters Association of Cebu. Tabal and fellow marathon runner Rafael Poliquit Jr. represented the Philippines in the 2016 Boston Marathon in April 2016. She finished 20th overall in the race.

Career

2016

On July 13, 2016, the Philippine Athletics Track and Field Association (PATAFA) reinstated Tabal in the national team, a year after she resigned due to conflicts between training and sponsorship agreements with Motorace Racing, Tabal's sponsor, but it was removed from the association's national team in September 2016, days after her Olympics stint.

On December 4, 2016, Tabal won the women's category of the Milo Marathon National Finals in Iloilo and she became the first runner in the marathon's history to complete a four-peat title record by clocking in 2 hours, 47 minutes and 57 seconds.

2017
At the first day of the 29th Southeast Asian Games on August 19, 2017, Tabal gave the country's first gold medal after dominating the 42 km women's marathon event with an official time of 2 hours, 48 minutes and 26 seconds.

References

Living people
Sportspeople from Cebu City
Filipino female marathon runners
1989 births
Athletes (track and field) at the 2016 Summer Olympics
Athletes (track and field) at the 2018 Asian Games
Olympic track and field athletes of the Philippines
Southeast Asian Games medalists in athletics
Southeast Asian Games gold medalists for the Philippines
Southeast Asian Games silver medalists for the Philippines
Competitors at the 2017 Southeast Asian Games
Asian Games competitors for the Philippines
Competitors at the 2019 Southeast Asian Games